Ashley Thomas (born 4 February 1985), also known by his stage name Bashy, is an English actor and rapper.

Early life 
Thomas was born in Hammersmith, West London, the first born of a Jamaican mother and Dominican father. He attended St. Mary's of the Angels RC Primary School. Aged eleven, his family moved to Kensal Rise, northwest London and he attended Cardinal Hinsley High School. Thomas attended The BRIT School for Performing Arts as a theatre student.

Before becoming an actor and musician, Thomas worked as a postman for the Royal Mail and later as a London Bus driver.

Career
In 2007, Thomas released the song "Black Boys". With frequent reports of shootings and stabbings on news bulletins, and with the media continuously focusing on the lack of role models in black communities, he felt that the nation's inner-city youth needed a reminder that they had a number of positive role models they could look to for inspiration. His début single provoked controversy as some critics called the track racist. This prompted the governing body Ofcom to investigate.

In 2008, Thomas started working on Adulthood. Noel Clarke, the writer and director of Adulthood, first encountered Thomas when he was passed a copy of The Chupa Chups Mixtape, which contained samples from Clarke's previous Kidulthood film. Clarke was so impressed with what he heard that his thoughts soon drifted from copyright protection to finding a way to record the Adulthood theme song. He asked Thomas to submit a track to be included on the official soundtrack, and Thomas delivered "Kidulthood to Adulthood". Thomas also curated music from other artists for Clarke to consider. Subsequently, Clarke asked Thomas to act as a music supervisor for the entire film.

Thomas released his debut album, Catch Me If You Can in June 2009. "Hiphop.com" rated the album "good" and stated, "Catch Me If You Can is a debut album that perfectly demonstrates how hip hop has become the world's local music. With vocal accents, lyrical references, swagger and varied production styles that will take a minute for the non-Brit to get their head around, much of this likable and well-intentioned set still deserves wider attention."

Acting
Thomas landed his first role in 2010 as Rager in British flick, Shank, an independent action film set in a decaying future London. He then went on to feature in 4.3.2.1. that same year. In April 2010, BBC Learning launched Off By Heart Shakespeare, a recital contest for secondary school pupils. For the project launch, Thomas was asked to play the role of Shylock from The Merchant of Venice.

Early in 2011, Thomas signed on to play the lead role in The Man Inside, opposite Peter Mullen, David Harewood and Michelle Ryan. Later that year, he was part of an ensemble cast in Cockneys vs Zombies, taking up the role of Mental Mickey.

Thomas' first television role came in the winter of 2011, in the Emmy award-winning series Black Mirror by Charlie Brooker for Channel 4 as Judge Wraith in the episode "Fifteen Million Merits". Thomas' next film was My Brother the Devil which received critical acclaim, winning awards at both the Sundance Film Festival and Berlin Film Festival.

In 2013, played the recurring character Jermaine Newton in Top Boy , a role he would reprise in 2019 after it was announced that Netflix would revive the British drama series.

Early in 2015, Thomas guest-starred in the BBC series The Interceptor. Thomas' next TV appearance would be as Gil in the short-lived fantasy drama Beowulf: Return to the Shieldlands for ITV in January 2016. Thomas signed up to the ensemble cast of A Hundred Streets released the same year.

Early in 2016, it was confirmed Thomas would appear as Calvin Hart in the HBO limited series The Night Of directed by James Marsh and Steve Zaillian. In March 2016, Thomas was set as a lead role in the 20th Century Fox Television reboot of franchise series 24 as Isaac Carter. In 2018, Thomas played the brother of lead character Luca Quinn (Cush Jumbo) in the legal drama The Good Fight, airing on CBS All Access.

In 2019 it was announced Thomas would co-star in the NYPD Blue reboot. That same year Thomas was set to headline the Amazon Prime series Them; for his performance he received an Independent Spirit Award nomination.

Discography

Studio albums

Mixtapes/EPs
2005: Ur Mum Vol One
2007: The Chupa Chups Mixtape
2008: Bashy.com
2010: The Fantasy Mixtape
2011: The Crunchie Mixtape
2012: The Great Escape EP
2013: Mixtape Legend (Compilation)

Singles and music videos

Guest appearances
 Clones – 2006 (By Akira the Don)
 Time Is Right Remix – 2009 (By Frisco Also Ft. JME & Black the Ripper)
 She Likes To (England Top 10) – 2009 (By Wiley)
 White Flag – Plastic Beach – 2010 (By Gorillaz Also Ft. Kano)
Dead Butterflies - Song Machine, Season One: Strange Timez  –  (By Gorillaz, Ft. Kano, Roxani Arias)
 4,3,2,1 -4.3.2.1. (Bashy Ft Paloma Faith and Adam Deacon) O.S.T
 Its All Love "Remix" – 2012 (By Scorcher Also Ft. Talay Riley, Kano & Wretch 32)
 Bad Boys Don't Cry – 2013 (By Loick Essien)

Filmography

Film

Television

Awards and nominations

References

External links

1985 births
English people of Dominica descent
Black British male rappers
Grime music artists
English male film actors
Black British male actors
21st-century English male actors
English male television actors
Male actors from London
Rappers from London
People from Chiswick
People from Hammersmith
People educated at the BRIT School
Living people
English people of Jamaican descent